Diuris immaculata, commonly known as the little Esperance bee orchid, is a rare species of orchid that is endemic to the south-west of Western Australia. It has between four and six leaves and up to three golden yellow flowers without markings. It is only known from near Esperance.

Description
Flowering occurs from September to November after fire.

Taxonomy and naming
Diuris immaculata was first formally described in 2006 by David Jones from a specimen collected north-east of Esperance and the description was published in Australian Orchid Research. The specific epithet (immaculata) is a Latin word meaning "unstained" or "unspotted", referring to the pure yellow colour of the flowers of this orchid.

Distribution and habitat
The little Esperance bee orchid grows in winter-wet areas from north-east of Esperance to the Cape Arid National Park.

Conservation
Diuris immaculata is classified as "not threatened" by the Western Australian Government Department of Parks and Wildlife,

References

 

immaculata
Endemic orchids of Australia
Orchids of Western Australia
Plants described in 2006